Măieruș is a commune in Brașov County, Transylvania, Romania. It is composed of two villages, Arini (Lüget) and Măieruș. The settlement was mentioned for the first time in 1377 as "villa nucum".

It was considered to be the most northern commune in the historical Burzenland region, although Apața is nowadays the northern limit of the region. Măieruș borders the following communes: Apața to the north; Belin and Hăghig to the east and southeast; Feldioara to the south; and Comăna and Hoghiz to the west.

The commune is crossed by national road . It lies on the left bank of the Olt River; the river Măieruș flows into the Olt in the village Măieruș. 

At the 2011 census, 56.1% of inhabitants were Romanians, 40.3% Roma, 2.6% Germans, and 0.9% Hungarians.

References

External links
 www.nussbach.de

Communes in Brașov County
Localities in Transylvania
Burzenland